Hassanabad is a village in Sub-Division Chorbat, Ghangche District of Gilgit-Baltistan, Pakistan, lying  east of Skardu, near the border of India.

Etymology 
The ancient name of Hassanabad was Kusting, which means a large storage of water. It is said that in ancient times the Buddhist lama who ruled the area name was Lama Kastiyang. and the name Kusting was derived from the lama's name.
The language spoken is Balti. The entire population is Sofia Noorbakhshia Muslim.
In the past it was the trade route to Ladakh and Kargil.

Geography 
Villages near Hassanabad includes Marcha, Dawoo, Piun, Partuk, Siksa and Franu.

The mountains and their surroundings generally have no forests, however there are some shrubs and herbs which are generally used by the local communities as medicinal herbs and for their cattle.

The Shyok River near the village is an important resources for irrigation. However the same river sometime creates havoc during summer with unpredictable floods.

Administration
Hassanabad consists of 7 blocks: Painkhor, Gabkhor, Thangkhor, Hajipakhor, Goostrang, Komick and Oraitan

Climate
The climate of Hassanabad during the summer is moderated by its mountain setting and the intense heat of lowland Pakistan does not reach here. The mountains also block out the summer monsoon and summer rainfall is thus quite low. However, these mountains result in very severe winter weather. During the April to October temperatures vary between a maximum of 27 °C and a minimum (in October) 8 °C. However, temperatures can drop to below -26 °C in the December-to-February midwinter period.

Resources
The natural resources of the village include agriculture, horticultural resources, the Shyok River, mountains and peaks.
The agriculture in the village is only summer based due to extreme cold in the winter where temperature goes to -26 C. The crops include some beans, maize, potatoes, and other food crops however communities have experimented less with the agriculture due to the natural limiting factors i.e. extreme cold.

Transport
Hassanabad is accessible only by road. The normal route to Hassanabad is via Shyok Valley Road, which connects it to  Skardu and to the district headquarters, Khaplu. The climate can have adverse effects on transport in and out of the Hassanabad, as the roads in and out of can be blocked for weeks.

References

 
 

Populated places in Ghanche District
Baltistan